Le Ménil-Broût is a commune in the Orne department in north-western France. It is around 10 km north-east of Alençon, 50 km north of Le Mans, and 150 km west of Paris.

See also
Communes of the Orne department
Parc naturel régional Normandie-Maine

References

Menilbrout